

Releases

January

February

March

April

Upcoming Movies

May

June

References

2017
Nepalese
2017 in Nepal